The 1978 Oklahoma Sooners football team represented the University of Oklahoma in the college football 1978 NCAA Division I-A season.  Oklahoma Sooners football participated in the former Big Eight Conference at that time and played its home games in Oklahoma Memorial Stadium where it has played its home games since 1923.  The team posted an 11–1 overall record and a 6–1 conference record to earn a share of the conference title under head coach Barry Switzer.  This was Switzer's sixth conference title in six seasons since taking the helm in 1973.

The team was led by All-Americans Billy Sims (who won the Heisman Trophy), Daryl Hunt, Reggie Kinlaw, and Greg Roberts,  The Sooners started the season with nine consecutive wins before losing to Nebraska.  During the season, OU faced ranked opponents four times (#14 Missouri, #6 Texas, and #4 & #6 Nebraska); four different opponents finished the season ranked.  Its only defeat came against Nebraska in their regular season match.  The Sooners were able to avenge that loss as an at-large selection to the Orange Bowl against conference co-champions Nebraska, who had claimed the automatic berth by virtue of their victory over OU.

Sims led the nation in scoring with 132 points (based on per game average of 10.9, which includes 120 in 11 games). Sims led the team in rushing with a record-setting 1896 yards, Thomas Lott led the team in passing with 487 yards, Bobby Kimball led the team in receiving with 207 yards, Hunt led the team with 157 tackles and Darrol Ray posted 8 interceptions.

The 5001 yards rushing remain second in Oklahoma football history behind the 1971 team's 5635.  The defense set the school's all-time record with 28 interceptions and tied the record of 50 forced turnovers.  Daryl Hunt set the school record for career tackles. Billy Sims became the only Sooner to post four 200-yard games in a season. Sims' 1896 yards stood as the Sooner record until Adrian Peterson posted 1925 in 2004.

Billy Sims became the sixth junior to win the Heisman Trophy. Sims was the nation's leading rusher and scorer for 1978. He averaged 160.1 yards and 10.9 points. He set the Big Eight Conference single season rushing record of 1,762 yards on 231 carries for an average of 7.6 yards. Sims was the only back in the nation's top 50 to average 7.0 per carry, and became the first player in Big Eight history to rush for more than 300 yards in three straight games.

Schedule

Roster

Game summaries

Stanford

Source: Eugene Register-Guard

West Virginia

Rice

Missouri

Texas

Source: Palm Beach Post
    
    
    
    
    
    
    

Statistics
OU: Billy Sims 25 Rush, 131 Yds (Sims had been injured in two previous meetings)

Kansas

Iowa State

Kansas State

Colorado

Nebraska

Oklahoma State

Orange Bowl

Rankings

Awards and honors
 All-American: Billy Sims, Daryl Hunt, Reggie Kinlaw, Greg Roberts,
Greg Roberts, Outland Trophy
Billy Sims, Associated Press College Player of the Year
Billy Sims, Heisman Trophy
Billy Sims, Sports Magazine's Player of the Year
Billy Sims, United Press College Player of the Year
Billy Sims, Walter Camp Foundation's Player of the Year
Big 8 rushing champion: Sims
NCAA DI scoring champion: Sims
NCAA team rushing leaders
NCAA team scoring leaders

Postseason

NFL draft
The following players were drafted into the National Football League following the season.

References

External links
 1978 season at SoonerStats.com

Oklahoma
Oklahoma Sooners football seasons
Big Eight Conference football champion seasons
Orange Bowl champion seasons
Oklahoma Sooners football